"The Woman the Unicorn Loved" is a 1981 science fiction short story by Gene Wolfe. It was first published in Asimov's Science Fiction.

Synopsis
A unicorn is created by genetic engineering and gets loose on a college campus.

Reception
"The Woman the Unicorn Loved" was a finalist for the 1982 Hugo Award for Best Short Story.

References

1981 short stories
Short stories by Gene Wolfe
1980s science fiction works
Science fiction short stories